Anand Katti (born 11 July 1972) is a first-class cricketer who played for Karnataka in the Ranji Trophy. He was born in Belgaum, Karnataka, India.

Anand is a right-hand batsman and Slow Left-arm orthodox bowler. He took a hat-trick in the 1988-89 Ranji Trophy playing for Karnataka against Kerala.

Teams
Ranji Trophy: Karnataka

See also
 List of hat-tricks in the Ranji Trophy

References

Karnataka cricketers
Living people
1972 births